Gerbert (sometimes Herbert) Aleksandrovich Yefremov (born March 15, 1933) is a Soviet and Russian scientist, design engineer and Professor of Technical Sciences.

Since 1984 (after the death of Vladimir Chelomey) - General Designer, from 1989 to 2007 - General Director, General Designer NPO Mashinostroyeniya. Directly involved or supervised the creation of
 Cruise missiles and rockets (P-5, S-5, «Kh-80»);
 Anti-ship missiles (P-35, «P-70 Ametist», «P-120 Malakhit», «P-500 Bazalt», «P-700 Granit», P-800 Oniks»);
 Supersonic cruise missile BrahMos for Indian forces;
 Intercontinental ballistic missiles UR-100, UR-100N;
 Military space station program Almaz;
 Orbital carrier rocket Strela;
 Hypersonic glide vehicle Avangard.

The recipient of state awards from the former Soviet Union and elsewhere, including the Padma Bhushan from India, he co-founded the Indo-Russian joint venture BrahMos.

He played a leading role in the design and construction of several sensitive military missile systems and space stations, and his identity and role in these projects was treated as a state secret for several years.

Notes

1933 births
20th-century Russian engineers
21st-century Russian engineers
Living people
Communist Party of the Soviet Union members
Academic staff of Bauman Moscow State Technical University
Academic staff of Moscow Aviation Institute
Heroes of Socialist Labour
Lenin Prize winners
Recipients of the Order "For Merit to the Fatherland", 2nd class
Recipients of the Order "For Merit to the Fatherland", 3rd class
Recipients of the Order of Lenin
Recipients of the Order of the Red Banner of Labour
Recipients of the Padma Bhushan in science & engineering
Recipients of the USSR State Prize
Russian aerospace engineers
Soviet aerospace engineers
Soviet mechanical engineers